San Diego shooting may refer to:

Cleveland Elementary School shooting, which occurred at Grover Cleveland Elementary School in 1979
San Ysidro McDonald's massacre, which occurred in the San Ysidro neighborhood of San Diego in 1984
San Diego State University shooting, which occurred at San Diego State University in 1996